All-Ukrainian Central Executive Committee was a representative body of the All-Ukrainian Congress of Soviets. It was the supreme legislative, administrative, executive controlling state power of Soviet Ukraine (Ukrainian SSR) between the sessions of the Congress of Soviets that acted between 1917 until 1938. In the very beginning this institution was established as the Central Executive Committee of Soviet of Ukraine at the First All-Ukrainian Congress of Soviets in Kharkiv on December 24–25, 1917. At the same congress was elected the People's Secretariat of Ukraine.

On March 19, 1919, the committee issued a declaration, in which it passed most of its authority to the Sovnarkom of Ukraine at that time headed by Christian Rakovsky.

Historical scope
The committee was first elected at the 1st All-Ukrainian Congress of Soviets on December 24, 1917, under the name of TsVK of Soviet Ukraine. The first committee was accounted for 41 members among which 35 were Bolsheviks and four were Left SRs. One of the members Yukhym Medvedev was the Ukrainian Social-Democratic Labour Party (left deviation). The committee did not last long and on April 18, 1918, was merged with the People's Secretariat into the Uprising Nine, a type of revkom.

TsVK was reanimated once again by the 3rd All-Ukrainian Congress of Soviets in Kharkiv on March 10, 1919. On the same session of the congress was adopted the Constitution of Ukrainian SSR which established legal basis for the Soviet power in the state. The committee was named as VUTsVK (for All-Ukrainian Central Executive Committee), but often was referred to as TsIKUK. The new committee was almost twice as big while the number of its members continued to grow from one convocation of the congress to another. The committee was reorganized after the adoption of the Constitution of Ukrainian SSR of 1937.

In total there were 14 convocations of the committee, 12 of which were taken place in Kharkiv. For almost 20 years from 1919 to 1938 head of the committee was Petrovsky. He however was overshadowed by more prominent Party leaders such as Vyacheslav Molotov, Lazar Kaganovich, Dmitriy Manuilsky, and others. The other chairmen of the committee served for less than a year.

Chairmen

Central Executive Committee of Soviet Ukraine
 Yukhym Medvedev December 24, 1917 – March 18, 1918
 Volodymyr Zatonsky March 19, 1918 – April 18, 1918 (2nd All-Ukrainian Congress in Yekaterinoslav)

All-Ukrainian Central Executive Committee (of Soviets)
Since 1935 the committee changed back to the Central Executive Committee of Ukrainian SSR.
 Hryhoriy Petrovsky March 10, 1919 – July 25, 1938

Subordinated offices
 Central Commission in affairs of National Minorities
 Extraordinary Commission (Cheka), created on 22 February 1918
 Regional Military-Revolutionary Committee to Combat Counter-Revolution, provisional office for creation of Red Guards elements, established on 31 December 1917

Treaty of Brest-Litovsk delegation
The signing of the Treaty of Brest-Litovsk was attended by representatives of the Soviet Ukraine. The delegation consisted of Vasyl Shakhrai and Yukhym Medvedev.

See also
 Verkhovna Rada
 All-Ukrainian Congress of Soviets
 Council of People's Commissars (Ukraine)

External links
Handbook on history of the Communist Party and the Soviet Union 
Всеукраїнський Центральний Виконавчий Комітет (ВУЦВК). Institute of History of Ukraine of the National Academy of Sciences of Ukraine
Babiy, B.M. Ukrainian Soviet State in the period of reconstruction of national economy (1921–1925). Kiev, 1961
History of Ukrainian SSR. Vol. 6–7. Kiev, 1984 

Government of the Ukrainian Soviet Socialist Republic
Ukraine
Russian Revolution in Ukraine
Central Executive Committee
1917 establishments in Ukraine
1938 disestablishments in Ukraine
1920s in Ukraine
1930s in Ukraine